Peculiar motion or peculiar velocity refers to the velocity of an object relative to a rest frame — usually a frame in which the average velocity of some objects is zero.

Galactic astronomy 

In galactic astronomy, peculiar motion refers to the motion of an object (usually a star) relative to a Galactic rest frame.

Local objects are commonly examined as to their vectors of position angle and radial velocity. These can be combined through vector addition to state the object's motion relative to the Sun. Velocities for local objects are sometimes reported with respect to the local standard of rest (LSR) – the average local motion of material in the galaxy – instead of the Sun's rest frame. Translating between the LSR and heliocentric rest frames requires the calculation of the Sun's peculiar velocity in the LSR.

Cosmology 

In physical cosmology, peculiar velocity refers to the components of a galaxy's velocity that deviate from the Hubble flow. According to Hubble's Law, galaxies recede from us at speeds proportional to their distance from us.

Galaxies are not distributed evenly throughout observable space, but are typically found in groups or clusters, where they have a significant gravitational effect one on another. Velocity dispersions of galaxies arising from this gravitational attraction are usually in the hundreds of kilometers per second, but they can rise to over 1000 km/s in rich clusters. This velocity can alter the recessional velocity that  would be expected from the Hubble flow and affect the observed redshift of objects via the relativistic Doppler effect. The Doppler redshift due to peculiar velocities is

which is approximately

for low velocities (small redshifts). This combines with the redshift from the Hubble flow and the redshift from our own motion  to give the observed redshift

(There may also be a gravitational redshift to consider.)

The radial velocity of a cosmologically "close" object can be approximated by

Redshift-space distortions can cause the spatial distributions of cosmological objects to appear elongated or flattened out, depending on the cause of the peculiar velocities. Elongation, sometimes referred to as the "Fingers of God" effect, is caused by random thermal motion of objects; however, correlated peculiar velocities from gravitational infall are the cause of a flattening effect. The main consequence is that, in determining the distance of a single galaxy, a possible error must be assumed.  This error becomes smaller as distance increases. For example, in surveys of type Ia supernovae, peculiar velocities have a significant influence on measurements out to redshifts around 0.5, leading to errors of several percent when calculating cosmological parameters.

Peculiar velocities can also contain useful information about the universe. The connection between correlated peculiar velocities and mass distribution has been suggested as a tool for determining constraints for cosmological parameters using peculiar velocity surveys.

References

See also 

 Proper motion
 Radial velocity
 Relative velocity
 Space velocity (astronomy)

Extragalactic astronomy
Galactic astronomy